Elementary algebra encompasses the basic concepts of algebra. It is often contrasted with arithmetic: arithmetic deals with specified numbers, whilst algebra introduces variables (quantities without fixed values). 

This use of variables entails use of algebraic notation and an understanding of the general rules of the operations introduced in arithmetic.  Unlike abstract algebra, elementary algebra is not concerned with algebraic structures outside the realm of real and complex numbers.

It is typically taught to secondary school students and builds on their understanding of arithmetic. The use of variables to denote quantities allows general relationships between quantities to be formally and concisely expressed, and thus enables solving a broader scope of problems. Many quantitative relationships in science and mathematics are expressed as algebraic equations.

Algebraic notation 

Algebraic notation describes the rules and conventions for writing mathematical expressions, as well as the terminology used for talking about parts of expressions. For example, the expression  has the following components:

A coefficient is a numerical value, or letter representing a numerical constant, that multiplies a variable (the operator is omitted). A term is an addend or a summand, a group of coefficients, variables, constants and exponents that may be separated from the other terms by the plus and minus operators. Letters represent variables and constants. By convention, letters at the beginning of the alphabet (e.g. ) are typically used to represent constants, and those toward the end of the alphabet (e.g.  and ) are used to represent variables. They are usually printed in italics.

Algebraic operations work in the same way as arithmetic operations, such as addition, subtraction, multiplication, division and exponentiation. and are applied to algebraic variables and terms. Multiplication symbols are usually omitted, and implied when there is no space between two variables or terms, or when a coefficient is used.

When a coefficient is one, it is usually omitted (e.g.  is written ). Likewise when the exponent (power) is one, (e.g.  is written ). When the exponent is zero, the result is always 1 (e.g.  is always rewritten to ). However , being undefined, should not appear in an expression, and care should be taken in simplifying expressions in which variables may appear in exponents.

Alternative notation
Other types of notation are used in algebraic expressions when the required formatting is not available, or can not be implied, such as where only letters and symbols are available. As an illustration of this, while exponents are usually formatted using superscripts, e.g., in plain text, and in the TeX mark-up language, the caret symbol  represents exponentiation, so  is written as "x^2". This also applies to some programming languages such as Lua. In programming languages such as Ada, Fortran, Perl, Python and Ruby, a double asterisk is used, so  is written as "x**2". Many programming languages and calculators use a single asterisk to represent the multiplication symbol, and it must be explicitly used, for example,  is written "3*x".

Concepts

Variables

Elementary algebra builds on and extends arithmetic by introducing letters called variables to represent general (non-specified) numbers.  This is useful for several reasons.

Variables may represent numbers whose values are not yet known.
Variables allow one to describe general problems, without specifying the values of the quantities that are involved. For example, it can be stated specifically that 5 minutes is equivalent to  seconds. A more general (algebraic) description may state that the number of seconds, where m is  the number of minutes.
Variables allow one to describe mathematical relationships between quantities that may vary.
Variables allow one to describe some mathematical properties. For example, a basic property of addition is commutativity which states that the order of numbers being added together does not matter.

Simplifying expressions 

Algebraic expressions may be evaluated and simplified, based on the basic properties of arithmetic operations (addition, subtraction, multiplication, division and exponentiation). For example,
Added terms are simplified using coefficients.
Multiplied terms are simplified using exponents. For example,  is represented as 
Brackets can be "multiplied out", using the distributive property.
Expressions can be factored. For example, by dividing both terms by  can be written as

Equations 

An equation states that two expressions are equal using the symbol for equality,  (the equals sign). One of the best-known equations describes Pythagoras' law relating the length of the sides of a right angle triangle:

An equation is the claim that two expressions have the same value and are equal. Some equations are true for all values of the involved variables (such as ); such equations are called identities. The values of the variables which make the equation true are the solutions of the equation and can be found through equation solving.

Another type of equation is inequality. Inequalities are used to show that one side of the equation is greater, or less, than the other. The symbols used for this are:  where  represents 'greater than', and  where  represents 'less than'. Just like standard equality equations, numbers can be added, subtracted, multiplied or divided. The only exception is that when multiplying or dividing by a negative number, the inequality symbol must be flipped.

Properties of equality 

By definition, equality is an equivalence relation, meaning it has the properties (a) reflexive (i.e. ), (b) symmetric (i.e. if  then ) (c) transitive (i.e. if  and  then ). It also satisfies the important property that if two symbols are used for equal things, then one symbol can be substituted for the other in any true statement about the first and the statement will remain true. This implies the following properties:

 more generally, for any function , if  then .

Properties of inequality 

 If      and      then   ;
 If      and      then   ;
 If      and      then   ;
 If      and      then   .
By reversing the inequation,  and  can be swapped, for example:
  is equivalent to

Substitution 

Substitution is replacing the terms in an expression to create a new expression. Substituting the terms of a statement makes a new statement. When the original statement is true independently of the values of the terms, the statement created by substitutions is also true. Often it's not known whether the statement is true independently of the values of the terms. And, substitution allows one to derive restrictions on the possible values, or show what conditions the statement holds under.

Consider .

If the original fact were stated as " implies  or ", then when saying "consider ," we would have a conflict of terms when substituting. This shows that substituting for the terms in a statement isn't always the same as letting the terms from the statement equal the substituted terms.

Solving algebraic equations 

The following sections lay out examples of some of the types of algebraic equations that may be encountered.

Linear equations with one variable 

Linear equations are so-called, because when they are plotted, they describe a straight line. The simplest equations to solve are linear equations that have only one variable. They contain only constant numbers and a single variable without an exponent. As an example, consider:

 Problem in words: If you double the age of a child and add 4, the resulting answer is 12. How old is the child?

Equivalent equation:  where   represent the child's age

To solve this kind of equation, the technique is add, subtract, multiply, or divide both sides of the equation by the same number in order to isolate the variable on one side of the equation.  Once the variable is isolated, the other side of the equation is the value of the variable. This problem and its solution are as follows:

In words: the child is 4 years old.

The general form of a linear equation with one variable, can be written as: 

Following the same procedure (i.e. subtract  from both sides, and then divide by ), the general solution is given by

Linear equations with two variables 

A linear equation with two variables has many (i.e. an infinite number of) solutions. For example:

Problem in words: A father is 22 years older than his son. How old are they?
Equivalent equation:  where  is the father's age,  is the son's age.

That cannot be worked out by itself. If the son's age was made known, then there would no longer be two unknowns (variables). The problem then becomes a linear equation with just one variable, that can be solved as described above.

To solve a linear equation with two variables (unknowns), requires two related equations. For example, if it was also revealed that:
 Problem in words
 In 10 years, the father will be twice as old as his son.
Equivalent equation
 

Now there are two related linear equations, each with two unknowns, which enables the production of a linear equation with just one variable, by subtracting one from the other (called the elimination method):

In other words, the son is aged 12, and since the father 22 years older, he must be 34. In 10 years, the son will be 22, and the father will be twice his age, 44. This problem is illustrated on the associated plot of the equations.

For other ways to solve this kind of equations, see below, System of linear equations.

Quadratic equations 

A quadratic equation is one which includes a term with an exponent of 2, for example, and no term with higher exponent. The name derives from the Latin quadrus, meaning square. In general, a quadratic equation can be expressed in the form , where  is not zero (if it were zero, then the equation would not be quadratic but linear). Because of this a quadratic equation must contain the term , which is known as the quadratic term.

 

Solving this, by a process known as completing the square, leads to the quadratic formula

where the symbol "±" indicates that both

 

are solutions of the quadratic equation.

Quadratic equations can also be solved using factorization (the reverse process of which is expansion, but for two linear terms is sometimes denoted foiling).  As an example of factoring:

 

which is the same thing as

 

All quadratic equations will have two solutions in the complex number system, but need not have any in the real number system. For example,

 

has no real number solution since no real number squared equals −1.
Sometimes a quadratic equation has a root of multiplicity 2, such as:

 

For this equation, −1 is a root of multiplicity 2. This means −1 appears twice, since the equation can be rewritten in factored form as

Complex numbers

All quadratic equations have exactly two solutions in complex numbers (but they may be equal to each other), a category that includes real numbers, imaginary numbers, and sums of real and imaginary numbers. Complex numbers first arise in the teaching of quadratic equations and the quadratic formula. For example, the quadratic equation

has solutions

Since  is not any real number, both of these solutions for x are complex numbers.

Exponential and logarithmic equations 

 

when . Elementary algebraic techniques are used to rewrite a given equation in the above way before arriving at the solution. For example, if

 

then, by subtracting 1 from both sides of the equation, and then dividing both sides by 3 we obtain

 

whence

 

or

 

 

For example, if

 

then, by adding 2 to both sides of the equation, followed by dividing both sides by 4, we get

 

whence

 

from which we obtain

Radical equations 

A radical equation is one that includes a radical sign, which includes square roots,   cube roots, and nth roots, . It has real solution(s):

For example, if:

then

 
and thus

System of linear equations 

There are different methods to solve a system of linear equations with two variables.

Elimination method 

An example of solving a system of linear equations is by using the elimination method:

 

Multiplying the terms in the second equation by 2:

 
 

Adding the two equations together to get:

 

which simplifies to

 

Since the fact that  is known, it is then possible to deduce that   by either of the original two equations (by using 2 instead of  ) The full solution to this problem is then

 

This is not the only way to solve this specific system;  could have been resolved before .

Substitution method 

Another way of solving the same system of linear equations is by substitution.

 

An equivalent for  can be deduced by using one of the two equations. Using the second equation:

 

Subtracting  from each side of the equation:

 

and multiplying by −1:

 

Using this  value in the first equation in the original system:

 

Adding 2 on each side of the equation:

 

which simplifies to

 

Using this value in one of the equations, the same solution as in the previous method is obtained.

 

This is not the only way to solve this specific system; in this case as well,  could have been solved before .

Other types of systems of linear equations

Inconsistent systems 

In the above example, a solution exists. However, there are also systems of equations which do not have any solution. Such a system is called inconsistent. An obvious example is

 

As 0≠2, the second equation in the system has no solution. Therefore, the system has no solution.
However, not all inconsistent systems are recognized at first sight. As an example, consider the system 
 

Multiplying by 2 both sides of the second equation, and adding it to the first one results in
 
which clearly has no solution.

Undetermined systems 

 

Isolating  in the second equation:

 

And using this value in the first equation in the system:

 

There is an infinite number of solutions for this system.

Over- and underdetermined systems 

Systems with more variables than the number of linear equations are called underdetermined. Such a system, if it has any solutions, does not have a unique one but rather an infinitude of them. An example of such a system is

 

When trying to solve it, one is led to express some variables as functions of the other ones if any solutions exist, but cannot express all solutions numerically because there are an infinite number of them if there are any.

A system with a higher number of equations than variables is called overdetermined. If an overdetermined system has any solutions, necessarily some equations are linear combinations of the others.

See also 
 History of elementary algebra
 Binary operation
 Gaussian elimination
 Mathematics education
 Number line
 Polynomial
 Cancelling out
 Tarski's high school algebra problem

References 
Leonhard Euler,   Elements of Algebra, 1770.  English translation Tarquin Press, 2007, also online digitized editions 2006, 1822.
Charles Smith, A Treatise on Algebra, in Cornell University Library Historical Math Monographs.
Redden, John. Elementary Algebra . Flat World Knowledge, 2011

External links

 
Algebra